Sonia Melissa Kruger (born 28 August 1965) is an Australian television presenter, actress, dancer and media personality, who has been a prominent figure in the media for over 20 years. Kruger is currently the host of Big Brother Australia and a presenter on The Voice Australia. She is best known for co-hosting the popular Australian version of Dancing with the Stars and for the role of Tina Sparkle in the dark 1992 film Strictly Ballroom. Kruger has also been a co-host of Today Extra. During her time at the Seven Network, Kruger has also reported for numerous other events, including the network's coverage of the Olympics, the Melbourne Cup and the Australian Open.

Early life
Born in Toowoomba, Queensland, she attended Beenleigh State High School, completing Year 12 in 1982. Kruger completed an arts degree at the University of Technology, Sydney, and taught dance at the National Institute of Dramatic Art (NIDA) in Sydney.

Career
In 1992, Kruger came to prominence in her acting debut as "Tina Sparkle" in the AFI Award-winning film Strictly Ballroom. She also served as a ballroom adviser for the film. This remains her only acting role to date. Following her film debut she hosted the children's variety show Wonder World! on the Nine Network. Kruger has been an entertainment reporter for Seven Network shows Today Tonight, Sunrise and 11AM. She previously hosted the morning program on the Sydney-based radio station Mix 106.5 with Dancing with the Stars judges Todd McKenney and Andy Grace.

In 2004, Kruger joined the Seven Network reality dance competition series Dancing with the Stars, the Australian version of the UK BBC television series Strictly Come Dancing. She co-hosted the series with both Daryl Somers and Daniel MacPherson over the course of the eleven seasons in which she appeared. In September 2008, Kruger was confirmed to host the Seven Network makeover reality show 10 Years Younger in 10 Days. Despite high ratings for its series premiere, Seven Network did not renew the series for a second season.

In November 2011, Kruger announced she was leaving both Dancing with the Stars and the Seven Network to pursue other opportunities. 
Kruger then signed a development deal with the Nine Network in November 2011. She was confirmed to host her own daytime talk show, Mornings, with singer and actor David Campbell. The series was designed to replace Kerri-Anne which ended that same month. The series premiered on 6 February 2012 (and continues into 2016 rebranded as Today Extra).  Kruger was also announced to host Nine Network's reboot of the competition reality series Big Brother Australia. Kruger replaced Kyle Sandilands and Jackie O, who hosted the series on Network Ten in its eighth season, after which the show was cancelled in 2008. 
Big Brother Australia 9 premiered on 13 August 2012 to 1.6 million viewers, the franchise's highest ratings since the series' third season. On 22 February 2015, it was announced that Kruger would be joining the fourth series of The Voice Australia as a co-host with Darren McMullen.

In November 2017, Kruger was announced as a co-host of Vision Australia's Carols by Candlelight alongside David Campbell. She replaced Lisa Wilkinson who had resigned from the Nine Network. Kruger was replaced by Allison Langdon after defecting to the Seven Network.

In August 2018, Kruger was announced as a presenter on the Nine Network new travel series, Helloworld, which aired on 7 October 2018. But she, Lauren Phillips, Denis Walter and Steven Jacobs were replaced by Giaan Rooney as a presenter, now on the Seven Network, from series 2.

In November 2019, Kruger announced her resignation from the Nine Network. She hosted Today Extra for the last time on Friday, 15 November. Seven Network CEO James Warburton confirmed her joining the network and announced that her roles would include hosting their upcoming reality show Mega Mini Golf.

In February 2020, the Seven Network announced that Kruger would host a revival of Big Brother, but due to filming commitments would no longer be hosting the upcoming series Holey Moley. However, in October 2020, Kruger was confirmed as the host of the show. 

In 2021, Kruger again hosted The Voice after Seven picked up the rights to the franchise following the Nine Network's failure to renew its contract with the show. Kruger is the current co-host of Channel 7’s Dancing With The Stars: All Stars, starring alongside her original co-host Daryl Somers.

Personal life
Kruger was married for six years (2002 to 2008) to James Davies, a British-born banker.

After the marriage ended in September 2008, she began seeing her current partner, Craig McPherson, executive producer of Today Tonight. She and McPherson had been trying for a child for years, through both IVF and natural methods. She became pregnant several times, but they ended in miscarriages. In August 2014, she announced she was pregnant, having conceived via in-vitro fertilisation (IVF) using a donor egg. In January 2015, Kruger gave birth to a daughter, Maggie.

Controversies
In 2008, during an episode of Dancing with the Stars, Kruger made a comment about a "sweat shop of illegal immigrants" working on her wardrobe for the Melbourne Cup carnival before referring to the show's musical director, Chong Lim, the show's Malaysian-born musical director with the words "How's the family, Chong? All right?" Channel 7 later issued an apology for her statement.

On 18 July 2016, during an appearance on the morning show Today, Kruger called for a complete ban on Muslims entering Australia, in agreement with an opinion piece by commentator Andrew Bolt. Kruger defended her comments saying "I believe it's vital in a democratic society to be able to discuss these issues without being labelled racist." The firebombing of a Perth radio station initially linked by media reports to the presenters disagreeing with Kruger's views was later determined by police to be coincidental and to have "nothing to do with the Islam discussion".

A racial vilification complaint against Kruger was made to the Civil and Administrative Tribunal over her statement about Muslim immigration. The Nine Network applied to have the complaint dismissed without a hearing, but this was refused. The complaint was made by Sam Ekermawi, who was described by The Daily Telegraph as a "serial offence-taker". The tribunal heard that Ekermawi had been involved in thirty-two hearings before courts and tribunals. The matter proceeded for directions in June 2018.

References

External links

1965 births
Australian people of German descent
Australian women television presenters
Australian television newsreaders and news presenters
Australian game show hosts
Big Brother (Australian TV series)
Television personalities from Melbourne
Living people
University of Technology Sydney alumni